Robert Johnson (born 18 March 1944) is a British guitarist. He was formerly in British folk rock band Steeleye Span from 1972 to 1977, and again from 1980 to 2001.

Early life
Johnson was born in London; his mother was a music teacher. He was educated at Westminster City School in London and the University of Hertfordshire.

Musical career
Johnson played acoustic and electric guitars and sang on Appalachian dulcimer player Roger Nicholson's 1972 album Nonesuch for Dulcimer, credited as Robert Johnson. He went on to become a member of the successful English electric folk band Steeleye Span in 1972, after being introduced by fiddler Peter Knight. 

Johnson first appeared on the group's fourth album, Below the Salt, where he took lead vocals on the track "King Henry". Along with "King Henry", he introduced many of the band's better-known songs into the repertoire, such as "Thomas the Rhymer", "Alison Gross", "Long Lankin" and "Gaudete".

Despite taking lead vocals on many songs, he was something of a background member. Johnson left Steeleye Span temporarily in 1977 to work on a concept album, The King of Elfland's Daughter, along with Peter Knight. However, he returned in 1980 to record Sails of Silver. After Tim Hart's departure from the band in 1980, Johnson became the sole guitarist and a more prominent member, taking on a central role for the albums Back in Line (1986) and Tempted and Tried (1989).

Owing to health reasons, he left Steeleye Span in 2000, but returned the following year to record Present – The Very Best of Steeleye Span. However, his remaining health issues prevented him from touring, so he was replaced by Ken Nicol. Nevertheless, he continues to be involved with the band, contributing songwriting and vocals to their studio albums, most recently Wintersmith in 2013.

Personal life
Johnson is a qualified psychologist, having completed a degree at the University of Hertfordshire. He and his former wife, Jane (now divorced), have two children, Barnaby and Holly.

References

1944 births
Living people
Alumni of the University of Hertfordshire
British folk guitarists
British rock guitarists
British male guitarists
People educated at Westminster School, London
Steeleye Span members
British folk rock musicians
Chrysalis Records artists